The Sichuan–Tibet railway, Sichuan–Xizang railway or Chuanzang railway is a high-elevation higher-speed railway in China that will connect Chengdu, the provincial capital of Sichuan, and Lhasa, the provincial capital of Tibet, when fully completed.

History
The first segment to enter operation was from Chengdu–Ya'an on 28 December 2018. The second segment to enter operation, from Nyingchi–Lhasa, opened on 25 June 2021. The final Ya'an–Nyingchi segment is expected to complete in 2030. It is the first electrified railway in the Tibet Autonomous Region, and the first higher-speed rail on the plateau. China high-speed railway service runs China Railway CR200J Fuxing series trainset on this line.

Construction
According to Chinese media, the Sichuan–Tibet railway is extremely difficult to construct. The railway has a elevation difference of 3000m. The starting point Sichuan basin is at only 300m altitude asl, while terminal is located 3000m above sea level on the Tibetan Plateau. 90% of the railway runs at an altitude of more than 3000m. 

The Nyingchi segment alone runs through the Yarlung Tsangpo river valley 16 times, and required the construction of 47 tunnels and 121 bridges. One of the most challenging segments was the Milin tunnel with 10km length. Milin tunnel lies down to 1200m below the top of a mountain range, and has an average altitude of 3100m asl., due to being situated on the Tibetan Plateau.

The railway is tunneled through areas with high-temperature earth-crust.

The total cost of the entire project is given with around 319.8 billion RMB.

Segments

Chengdu–Ya'an segment

The Chengdu to Ya'an segment is 140 km long and has a design speed of 200 km/h. This section opened on 28 December 2018.

Ya'an–Nyingchi segment
It traverses a seismically active region with difficult terrain and a fragile ecology, and is the most difficult part of the railway to construct. The segment's construction started on 8 November 2020 with construction expected to last until 2030.

Nyingchi–Lhasa segment

The Nyingchi to Lhasa segment has completed construction and has begun operations. Nyingchi segment includes 47 tunnels, 121 bridges and a 525m long Zangmu Railway Bridge.

Construction began on 19 December 2014.  Tracklaying completed in December 2020. This section opened on 25 June 2021. 

On 25 June 2021, the segment began operations, with the first train leaving Lhasa for Nyingchi at 10.30 am. The railway reduces the travel time from Lhasa to Nyingchi from 5 hours to 3.5 hours and Shannan to Nyingchi from 6 hours to more than 2 hours compared to roads. Aside from passenger service, it’s also capable of transporting 10 million tonnes of freight annually.

Rolling stock
160 km/h services use the China Railway CR200J trainsets. CR200J Plateau variant will serve the railway, and it's a type of bi-mode locomotive specifically designed for plateau operations. 31 sets of train in 12 car configuration is in service. A combination of diffusion and distributed oxygen systems are installed to help alleviate altitude sickness for passengers on the trip.

Benefits 
The railway will greatly reduce travel times and increase connectivity between Lhasa and the eastern cities of the country. Prior to the Sichuan-Tibet railway, one must travel via Golmud and Lanzhou to make this journey by rail. The line is a serious engineering challenge, and serves the purpose of integrating local communities, as well as the interior and coastal regions of China. The railway is also expected to have major positive impact on tourism in the western parts of the country.

See also
 Qinghai–Tibet railway
 Lhasa–Xigazê railway

References

Railway lines in China
Mountain railways
Rail transport in Tibet
Standard gauge railways in China